STS Sanok is an ice hockey team in Sanok, Poland. The team played in the Eastern Division of the Slovak 2. Liga, the third tier of ice hockey in Slovakia. The team was inactive during the 2016–2017 season due to financial difficulties. Before that and now, the team competes in the Polska Liga Hokejowa (PHL), the top-level hockey league in Poland.

The team's full legal name is Sanockie Towarzystwo Sportowe S. A.. The club was founded in 1958 as RKS Sanoczanka, and has undergone a number of name changes. It has been playing under the name Ciarko KH 58 Sanok since 2017, for sponsorship reasons. They play their home games in Arena Sanok, which has a capacity of 3,100 people. Between 1965 and 2006, they played their games at Torsan, which has now been taken down and is being used as a parking lot.

The club's main sponsors are PBS Bank, Ciarko, and the City of Sanok. The head coach is Marcin Ćwikła, a former homegrown player who also played for the Polish national team.

History

STS Sanok was founded in 1958 as RKS Sanoczanka, and have changed their name several times since. The team was also called Stal Sanok from 1960 to 1991, STS Sanok from 1991 to 1994, STS-Autosan Sanok from 1994 to 1999, SKH Sanok from 1999 to 2001, KH Sanok from 2001 to 2011, Ciarko PBS Bank KH Sanok from 2011 to 2015, before taking on their present Ciarko PBS Bank STS Sanok name.

Sanok has won the Polska Hokej Liga playoff championship twice, in the 2011/2012 and 2013/2014 seasons. They won the Polish Cup twice, in 2010/11 and 2011/12.

Achievements

Polish League Playoff Champion:
 (2) 2011–12, 2013–14

Polish League Regular Season:
 (2) 2011–12, 2012–13

Polish Cup:
 Winners (2):  2010–11, 2011–12
 Runners-up (3): 2012–13, 2013–14, 2014–15

Promotion to Polish League:
1976, 1992, 2004.

Season-by-season results

2017/18 roster
Updated 19 November 2017

|}

Notable players

Retired numbers

Homegrown:
  Jan Paszkiewicz (top scorer in club history)
  Tomasz Demkowicz (Polish national team player)
  Marcin Ćwikła (Polish national team player)
  Michał Radwański (Polish national team player)
  Maciej Mermer (Polish national team player)

Poles from Other Clubs:
  Marek Cholewa (3-time Olympian)
  Jerzy Sobera (Olympian)
  Tomasz Wawrzkiewicz (6-time Representative at the World Championships)
  Marcin Kolusz (Captain of Poland & 1st Player in Club history that has been drafted into the NHL)
  Wojtek Wolski (One of the many Poles in the NHL – Played in Sanok during the 2012 NHL Lockout)

Foreigners:
   Mike Danton (former NHLer, Naturalized Polish citizen, Poland national team player)
  Samson Mahbod
  Zenon Konopka (former NHLer)
  Martin Richter (Czech Republic national team player, 1st Player in Club history that has won a World Championship)
  Martin Vozdecký (Czech Republic national roller hockey team player)
  Petr Šinágl (Czech Republic national roller hockey team player)
  Dmitri Suur (Estonia national team player)
  Kaupo Kaljuste (Estonia national team player)
  Nicolas Besch (France national team player)
  Sergei Antipov (Kazakhstan national team player)
  Anthony Aquino (Italy national team player)
  Martin Ivičič (Slovakia national team player)
  Miroslav Zaťko (Slovakia national team player)
  Peter Bartoš (Slovakia national team player, 1st Player in Club history that has played in the NHL)
  Stanislav Hudec (Slovakia national team player)
  Vladislav Baláž (Slovakia national team player)
  Viliam Čacho (Slovakia national team player)
  Jakob Milovanovič (Slovenia national team player)

References

External links
Official site (In Polish)
Facebook Page (In Polish)
EliteProspects

Ice hockey teams in Poland
KH
Sport in Podkarpackie Voivodeship
Carpathian League teams